These are articles that list people of a particular religious or political belief or other worldview.

Lists of people by political belief
 List of Christian leftists
 List of social democrats
 List of neoconservatives

 List of anarchists
 List of anarchist musicians
 List of anarchist poets
 List of American anarchists
 List of Jewish anarchists
 List of Russian anarchists

 List of left communists
 List of Marxists
 List of Portuguese communists
 List of Romanian communists
 List of communists imprisoned by the Kingdom of Romania
 List of German Communist Party members

 List of libertarian organizations
 List of libertarian political parties
 List of libertarians in the United States

 List of nationalists
 List of Arab nationalists
 List of Canadian nationalist leaders

 List of people who supported eugenics

 List of democratic socialists
 List of Muslim socialists
 List of Christian socialists

Lists of people by religious belief
List of Bahá'ís
 List of former Bahá'ís
List of Buddhists
 List of Korean Buddhists
 List of Rinzai Buddhists
 List of Marathi Buddhists
 List of converts to Buddhism
 List of former Buddhists
Lists of Christians
 List of converts to Christianity
 Lists of patriarchs, archbishops, and bishops
 List of Christian missionaries
 List of Christian preachers
 List of Christian theologians
 List of religious studies scholars
 List of Jesuits
 List of Catholic priests
 List of saints
 List of television evangelists
 Lists of former Christians
 List of former Protestants
 By Christian denomination:
List of Anglicans and Episcopalians
List of Baptists
List of Huguenots
List of Latter-day Saints
The Church of Jesus Christ of Latter-day Saints
List of LDS Church presidents
List of LDS Church Apostles
List of LDS Church general authorities
Community of Christ
List of Community of Christ Prophet–Presidents
The Church of Jesus Christ (Bickertonite)
List of Church of Jesus Christ presidents
List of Methodists
List of Pentecostals and non-denominational Evangelicals
List of Puritans
List of Quakers
Lists of Roman Catholics
 List of former Roman Catholics
 List of popes
List of Seventh-day Adventists
List of Christian Universalists
List of Unitarians, Universalists, and Unitarian Universalists
List of Confucianists
List of Hindus
 List of converts to Hinduism
 List of former Hindus
List of Jains
 List of Jains
List of Jews
 List of converts to Judaism
 List of rabbis
 List of Jewish Nobel laureates
 List of former Jews
Monks
List of Muslims
 List of caliphs
 List of converts to Islam
 List of former Muslims
 By Muslim denomination:
 List of Ahmadis
List of occultists
List of pagans (includes believers in Wicca)
List of Pantheists
List of Rastafarians
List of Satanists
List of Sikhs
 List of converts to Sikhism
Swedenborgians
List of Taoists
List of Thelemites
List of Unificationists
List of ministers of the Universal Life Church
List of Zoroastrians

Agnostics, atheists, humanists
List of agnostics
Lists of atheists
List of Deists
List of former atheists and agnostics
List of South African atheists
List of humanists
List of Jewish atheists and agnostics

Other worldviews
 List of vegans
 List of vegetarians

See also
 Religions of the world
 List of Biblical figures 
 List of messiah claimants
 List of lists of lists